Moroto may refer to:

Moroto District in north-eastern Uganda
Moroto Town in Moroto District, Uganda
Moroto Airport
Mount Moroto in Moroto District, Uganda
Moroto County in Alebtong District, Uganda

People with the surname
Samuel Moroto (born 1960), Kenyan politician